At War in the Diamond Fields is a 1921 German silent adventure film directed by Hans Schomburgk and starring Oskar Marion, Meg Gehrts-Schomburgk and Willy Kaiser-Heyl. It premiered on 13 August 1921.

Cast

References

Bibliography

External links

1921 films
Films of the Weimar Republic
German silent feature films
German adventure films
Films directed by Hans Schomburgk
Films set in Africa
German black-and-white films
1921 adventure films
Silent adventure films
1920s German films